Old Warden Aerodrome  is located  east southeast of Bedford, in Bedfordshire, England. The privately owned aerodrome serves The Shuttleworth Collection, which contains a large working collection of vintage aircraft, cars, motor cycles and agricultural vehicles and equipment.

Up-to-date airfield information including the ability to PPR is available on The Old Warden Aerodrome website: https://oldwardenaerodrome.co.uk.

References

Airports in the East of England
History of Bedfordshire
Airports in Bedfordshire
Airports for antique aircraft